Dany Leviatan (born 21 February 1942) is an Israeli mathematician and former rector of Tel Aviv University.

Biography
Dany Leviatan completed his B.Sc. and M.Sc. at the Hebrew University of Jerusalem. A participant in the Academic Atuda program, Leviatan served as a mathematician in the Israel Air Force while working on his doctorate at the Hebrew University, which he completed in 1966.

Academic career
He worked as visiting professor at the University of Illinois at Champaign-Urbana from 1967 to 1970 through the Fulbright Scholarship Program, and became associate professor at Tel Aviv University in 1972. Leviatan served as head of the university's Department of Mathematics from 1972 to 1974, and dean of the Faculty of Exact Sciences from 1976 to 1980. He became head of the recently established School of Mathematics in 1982.

Leviatan was appointed rector of Tel Aviv University on 16 August 2005, a position he kept until 2010. He briefly served as acting president of the university following the resignation of Zvi Galil in July 2009.

Selected works

See also

References

1942 births
Approximation theorists
Living people
Hebrew University of Jerusalem alumni
Israeli mathematicians
Academic staff of Tel Aviv University